Barry Arthur Wealthall (born 1 May 1942) is an English former professional footballer who played as a defender in the Football League for Nottingham Forest, Grimsby Town and York City. He was an England youth international.

References

1942 births
Living people
Footballers from Nottingham
English footballers
England youth international footballers
Association football defenders
Nottingham Forest F.C. players
Grimsby Town F.C. players
York City F.C. players
English Football League players